Manhush  is an urban settlement (town) in Donetsk Oblast (province), located in the industrial region of the Donets Basin. It was the administrative seat of Manhush Raion, but is now administered under Mariupol Raion. The population:

History 
The settlement was founded by Crimean Greeks (out of Mangup) who were deported (around 800 people) by Alexander Suvorov's troops. It was a village in Mariupol uyezd of Yekaterinoslav Governorate of the Russian Empire. In 1946 to 1995 it was known as Pershotravneve or Pershotravnevy (in Russian). In January 1989 the population of the settlement was 7467 people.

In April 2022, during the Russo-Ukraine War, the town was reported to have been the site of a mass grave consisting of three hundred pits, each measuring six feet by ten feet. The mass graves are believed to contain civilian corpses taken from the siege of nearby Mariupol.

See also
 Urums, Turkophone Greeks
 Greeks in Ukraine
 Treaty of Küçük Kaynarca (Metropolitanate of Gothia and Annexation of Crimea by the Russian Empire)

Gallery

References

External links
 Pershotravneve at the Informational portal for the Donetsk Oblast as part of the Ukrainian SSR.

Greektowns

Urban-type settlements in Mariupol Raion